Monte Colma is a mountain in Liguria, northern Italy, part of the Ligurian Apennines.  It is located in the provinces of Genoa and Alessandria. It lies at an altitude of 856 metres.

Nature conservation 
Part of the mountain is included in the Piedmontese natural park of the Capanne di Marcarolo.

References

Mountains of Liguria
Mountains of Piedmont
Mountains under 1000 metres
Mountains of the Apennines